The Stör is a river in Schleswig-Holstein, Germany, right tributary of the Elbe.

The Stör rises east of Neumünster, and flows west through Neumünster, Kellinghusen, and Itzehoe. The Stör joins the Elbe near Glückstadt. The  lower part between the Elbe and Itzehoe is navigable for Class III ships, the  middle part between Itzehoe and Kellinghusen-Rensing is navigable but not classified.

See also
List of rivers of Schleswig-Holstein

References

Rivers of Schleswig-Holstein
 
Federal waterways in Germany
Rivers of Germany